Regional Studies is a monthly peer-reviewed academic journal covering research in theoretical development, empirical analysis, and policy debate in the field of regional studies and regional science. It is an official journal of the Regional Studies Association and is published by Routledge. The editor-in-chief is David Bailey (Birmingham Business School).

External links 

Taylor & Francis academic journals
English-language journals
Publications established in 1967
Monthly journals
Area studies journals